Heinz Wattie's Limited (or simply Wattie's) is a New Zealand-based food producer of frozen and packaged fruit, vegetables, sauces, baby food, cooking sauces, dressings and pet foods in the New Zealand market.

History
Founded in 1934 by Sir James Wattie, the company operated in New Zealand under the name of J. Wattie Canneries Limited (later J Wattie Foods Limited and its related companies). In 1980, Wattie Industries and Goodman Fielder  purchased shares in each other’s companies that led to a merger in 1987 to create Goodman Fielder Wattie Ltd. In 1992 the Wattie’s group was bought from Goodman Fielder by American-based H. J. Heinz Company for $565 million.

The company employs around 1,900 people, of which approximately 350 are temporary or casual. The company produces its own Wattie's products, some international brands of H. J. Heinz Company, as well as local products under brands like Craig's, Farex, Eta, Oak, Good Taste Company, Greenseas, Earth's Best, Complan, Chef and Champ.

The company has three production centres in New Zealand. Two are located in Hastings, New Zealand, where the company was founded, and over 1,200 product lines are produced there.

In Christchurch, the largest city in the South Island, the company has its third production plant which focuses on producing frozen and dry vegetables.

Products
Wattie's has an extensive product line consisting of thousands of products.

Its baby food products are broken down into five main categories: birth - 4 months, 4 – 6 months, 6 – 7 months, 8 – 9 months and 12 months or older.

Other canned foods include baked beans, spaghetti, soup, preserved fruits such as apricots and pears, sauce bases, animal food, frozen meals and frozen vegetables.

Watties tomato sauce is made in New Zealand, and products carry the label "NZ's Favourite". The television commercials throughout the 1990s used the line "You'll always be a Kiwi, if you love our Wattie's Sauce".

See also 
 Goodman Fielder Wattie Book Awards, 1968–1993

References

External links
 
 Wattie's Food In A Minute Recipe website

Heinz brands
Food manufacturers of New Zealand
Food and drink companies established in 1934
New Zealand brands
Companies based in Hastings
New Zealand companies established in 1934